Darya Singh (born 5 September 1947) is an Indian equestrian. He competed in two events at the 1980 Summer Olympics.

References

1947 births
Living people
Indian male equestrians
Olympic equestrians of India
Equestrians at the 1980 Summer Olympics
Place of birth missing (living people)